Af Jochnick is a Swedish surname. Notable people with the surname include:

Jonas af Jochnick (1937–2019), Swedish businessman
Kerstin af Jochnick (born 1958), Swedish banker
Robert af Jochnick (born 1940), Swedish businessman, brother of Jonas

Swedish-language surnames